Anna Cattaneo (23 August 1911 – 23 October 2002) was an Italian figure skater. She competed in the pairs event at the 1936 Winter Olympics.

References

External links
 

1911 births
2002 deaths
Italian female pair skaters
Olympic figure skaters of Italy
Figure skaters at the 1936 Winter Olympics
Figure skaters from Milan